Crane Independent School District is a public school district based in Crane, Texas, United States. The district's boundaries parallel that of Crane County.  In 2009, the school district was rated "academically acceptable" by the Texas Education Agency.

Schools
The district has three campuses:
Crane High School (grades 9–12)
Crane Middle School (grades 6–8)
Crane Elementary School (grades PK-5)

Consistent with the school's (and county's) name, the mascot is the Golden Cranes/Ladybirds.

Activities

Fall of 2022, the Crane High School's Crane Golden Crane Marching Band received their 40th year of Division Ones at the UIL Region Marching Contest.

2021-2022 marked the 39th year in a row the Crane High School Crane Golden Crane Band has received Sweepstakes for attaining the highest rating (1) in UIL Marching and Concert & Sight-Reading contests. The Crane Golden Crane Band advanced to the UIL State Marching Band Championship for their 18th appearance, making the band tied for sixth most appearances in the State of Texas overall (A - 6A).

References

External links

Crane ISD

School districts in Crane County, Texas